Vladimir Manislavić (born 5 March 1974) is a Serbian football manager and former player.

Playing career
After starting out at Zvezdara, Manislavić joined OFK Beograd in 1994. He also played for Radnički Kragujevac, before returning to Zvezdara in 1998.

In 1999, Manislavić moved abroad to Germany and signed with Dynamo Dresden. He was the team's top scorer in the 2000–01 NOFV-Oberliga Süd with 11 goals, securing a transfer to FC Augsburg.

Managerial career
In 2010, Manislavić started his managerial career as an assistant to Manfred Paula at TSV Aindling.

References

External links
 

1974 births
Living people
Footballers from Belgrade
Serbia and Montenegro footballers
Serbian footballers
Association football forwards
FK Zvezdara players
OFK Beograd players
Dynamo Dresden players
FC Augsburg players
FC Augsburg II players
SSV Ulm 1846 players
BC Aichach players
First League of Serbia and Montenegro players
Second League of Serbia and Montenegro players
Regionalliga players
NOFV-Oberliga players
Bayernliga players
Serbia and Montenegro expatriate footballers
Serbian expatriate footballers
Expatriate footballers in Germany
Serbia and Montenegro expatriate sportspeople in Germany
Serbian expatriate sportspeople in Germany
Serbian football managers
FC Augsburg non-playing staff
Serbian expatriate football managers
Expatriate football managers in Germany